The 1936–37 Boston Bruins season was the Bruins' 13th season in the National Hockey League. The team finished second in the American Division and lost in the quarter-finals of the playoffs to the Montreal Maroons.

Offseason

Regular season

Final standings

Record vs. opponents

Schedule and results

Playoffs
The Boston Bruins lost the Quarter-Finals to the Montreal Maroons 2–1 and have lost the Quarter-Finals two years in a row.

Player statistics

Regular season
Scoring

Goaltending

Playoffs
Scoring

Goaltending

Awards and records

Transactions

See also
1936–37 NHL season

References

External links

Boston Bruins seasons
Boston
Boston
Boston Bruins
Boston Bruins
1930s in Boston